The Marilyn G. Rabb Foundation, abbreviated as MGR Foundation, is a Chicago-based nonprofit organization in the United States. Its mission is to help at-risk youth overcome social and educational barriers to success. The MGR Foundation was founded by Lionel Rabb, the stepson of Marilyn G. Rabb. The foundation's recent work includes organizing a large youth rally against gang violence in Pittsburgh as well as sponsoring an initiative to "green" urban schools.

References

Youth organizations based in Illinois